Christopher L. Hoke (born April 6, 1976) is a former American football defensive lineman in the National Football League. He spent his entire eleven-year professional career with the Pittsburgh Steelers.

High school years
Hoke attended Foothill High School in Santa Ana, California, and won three varsity letters each in football and track and field. In football, he was a three-time All-League honoree, a two-time All-CIF honoree, and a two-time All-County honoree. As a senior, he was also named the League Defensive Player of the Year and helped lead his team to the CIF quarterfinals. In track and field, he was a three-time League Champion, and a three-time CIF Meet participant. Hoke graduated from Foothill High School in 1994.

College career
Hoke's college career was put on hold for a 2-year mission for the Church of Jesus Christ of Latter-day Saints to Belgium and France. Hoke played college football at Brigham Young University, where he finished his collegiate career with 141 tackles and 14 sacks. He majored in communications.

Professional career
Hoke was signed by the Pittsburgh Steelers as an undrafted free agent after the 2001 NFL Draft. For the first three years of his Steelers career, he was inactive for the majority of time and did not get any playing time. In 2004, Hoke totaled 24 tackles and 1 sack after taking over the starting nose tackle position for the injured Casey Hampton six games into the season. In 2005, he recorded six tackles and was also part of the Steelers team that won Super Bowl XL where he also recorded a tackle. The following season, he played in all 16 games and finished the season with 12 tackles.
On June 21, 2007, he signed a 3-year extension through 2010. He finished the 2007 season with six tackles and 0.5 sacks. Hoke started his first game of the 2008 season in Pittsburgh's Monday Night Football game against the Ravens, in Week Four of the 2008 season.

Hoke announced his retirement on January 25, 2012. He spent his entire 11-year professional career with the Pittsburgh Steelers.

Broadcasting career
In 2015, Hoke replaced fellow ex-lineman Edmund Nelson as the Steelers post-game analyst on KDKA-TV.

References

External links 
 
 Current Stats
 

1976 births
American football defensive tackles
BYU Cougars football players
Living people
Pittsburgh Steelers players
Players of American football from Long Beach, California
Latter Day Saints from California
American Mormon missionaries in Belgium
American Mormon missionaries in France